Road Rash: Jailbreak is a racing video game developed by EA Redwood Shores for the PlayStation version and Magic Pockets for the Game Boy Advance version and published by Electronic Arts for PlayStation in 2000 and for Game Boy Advance in 2003. It is the sixth and final game in the Road Rash series.

Gameplay
The game plays similarly to previous games developed in the Road Rash series, which involves the player racing their motorcycle against other motorcyclists. Gameplay favors an arcade-like style, with little emphasis on realism. While racing, the player has the option of punching, or using weapons to attack other opponents, to slow down their progress. The ultimate goal is to place first in the race in order to earn points to upgrade the player's weapon and nitro. Conversely, the worst quote is to finish last, which doesn't earn points, or be stopped by police officers, where the player actually loses points. Despite sharing many characteristics with past games in the series, Road Rash Jailbreak puts a stronger emphasis on the racing aspect of the game, and less on combat.

The individual courses for the game are pieced together from a larger system of interconnected grids of roads. Courses may overlap common segments of other tracks, but often have different start or end points, or have the player turning down alternate routes. The modes on Road Rash Jailbreak are: Jailbreak, Five-O, Time Trial, Cops and Robbers, Skull-to-skull, and Sidecar mode.

Reception

The Game Boy Advance version of Road Rash: Jailbreak received "average" reviews according to the review aggregation website Metacritic. Game Informer gave it an unfavorable review, over a month before it was released. Doug Trueman of NextGen said in his bottom line that the first Road Rash was still better than the PlayStation version.

References

External links

2000 video games
Cancelled GameCube games
Electronic Arts games
Game Boy Advance games
Magic Pockets games
Motorcycle video games
Multiplayer and single-player video games
PlayStation (console) games
Racing video games
Road Rash
Split-screen multiplayer games
Vehicular combat games
Video game sequels
Video games about police officers
Video games set in prison
Video games developed in the United States